The Rhein cabinet is the current state government of Hesse, sworn in on 31 May 2022 after Boris Rhein was elected as Minister-President of Hesse by the members of the Landtag of Hesse. It is the 23rd Cabinet of Hesse.

It was formed after the resignation of Minister-President Volker Bouffier, and is a continuation of the coalition government of the Christian Democratic Union (CDU) and Alliance 90/The Greens (GRÜNE) formed after the 2018 Hessian state election. Excluding the Minister-President, the cabinet comprises eleven ministers. Seven are members of the CDU and four are members of the Greens.

Formation 
The previous cabinet was a coalition government of the CDU and the Greens led by Minister-President Volker Bouffier of the CDU. In February 2022, Bouffier announced his resignation and intention to leave office at the end of May. He nominated Boris Rhein, President of the Landtag and former minister in Bouffier's second cabinet, as his successor. Shortly after, Rhein was unanimously confirmed by a CDU party conference.

Rhein was elected as Minister-President by the Landtag on 31 May 2022, winning 74 votes out of 137 cast.

Composition

External links

References 

Government of Hesse
State governments of Germany
Cabinets established in 2022
2022 establishments in Germany
Current governments